Chicago Rockford International Airport , typically referred to as Rockford International Airport, Chicago Rockford, or by its IATA call letters, RFD, is a commercial airport in Rockford, Illinois, located  northwest of Chicago.  Established in 1946, the airport was built on the grounds of the former Camp Grant facility, which served as one of the largest training facilities for the U.S. Army during both World Wars.  The Federal Aviation Administration (FAA) National Plan of Integrated Airport Systems for 2017–2021 categorized it as a non-hub primary commercial service facility.

As an alternative location for leisure-oriented travelers, the airport currently receives passenger service through Allegiant Air, which flies to six year-round destinations. The third-busiest Chicago airport in Illinois, the Rockford Airport served 103,000 passengers in 2021. RFD is among the fastest-growing cargo airports in the world. UPS Airlines operates a major hub at the airport. The airport is also served by Amazon Air. In the 2020s, cargo operations underwent further expansions, attracting cargo flights from Germany and China.

History

RFD traces its history to 1917, when Camp Grant was established by the U.S. Army as one of the largest military training facilities in the United States.  At the end of 1923, the Army closed Camp Grant as an active facility, transferring it to the Illinois National Guard.  In 1941, the facility was reactivated by the Army.  During World War II, Camp Grant served as one of the largest Army induction and training centers in the United States, training medical personnel, and serving as a prisoner of war confinement center.  Following the end of the war, the facility served as a separation center.  In 1946, Camp Grant was shut down for the second (and final) time.

After World War II, Illinois adopted the Airport Authority Act; the Greater Rockford Airport Authority was created in 1946.  In 1948, the Camp Grant land was officially transferred to the airport authority from the federal government. Of the 5,460 acres (plus a 6,000 acre rifle range) of Camp Grant, the airport authority acquired the western 1,500 acres of the facility, bordered by the Rock River to the north and the Kishwaukee River to the south. In 1954, construction commenced on the airport and terminal.

The airport demolished the final remaining Camp Grant buildings on the airport property in 1974. In an effort to expand passenger airline service, the current passenger terminal was built in 1987. United Parcel Service opened the first of two cargo facilities at the airport in 1994.  While its centralized location in northern Illinois was a selling point for cargo service, scheduled passenger airline service struggled, ending in 2001. In the 1980s and 1990s, Rockford had passenger service to O'Hare Airport, but many passengers considered bus service or driving to Chicago a viable alternative.  In 2003, the airport restored passenger service; instead of offering regional service to Chicago or elsewhere in the Midwest, the airport presented itself as an alternative for leisure-based travelers, offering low-cost flights to Florida.

Coleman Air Transport had a small hub at RFD in the late 1970s with Grumman Gulfstream Is and was planning to introduce Douglas DC-9-10 nonstop to New York LaGuardia Airport before losing its operating certificate and going out of business.

The first airline flights were on Mid-Continent Airlines in 1950. Successor Braniff pulled out in 1955, leaving Ozark, which had arrived in 1951. Ozark Douglas DC-9-10s and McDonnell Douglas DC-9-30s flew nonstop to Chicago O'Hare Airport and direct to Denver in 1976.  TWA flew Boeing 727s Rockford to Chicago O'Hare for a couple years starting May 1980. McClain Airlines Boeing 727-100s flew nonstop to Chicago O'Hare. The original Frontier Airlines (1950-1986) Boeing 737-200s served Rockford from 1984 until late 1986 nonstop to Cedar Rapids, Madison and Milwaukee and direct to Denver when the operation was transferred to Britt Airways which flew turboprops for a short time. Direct Air served the airport until March 2012. The current version of Frontier offered mainline service to Denver until 2013. It also offered several charter flights, on behalf of Apple Vacations.

The airport got its first control tower in the 1950s with the expansion of services from Braniff, Mid-Continent, and Ozark. Radar was installed in the tower in the 1970s, and the airport soon began operating 24/7.

Apple Vacations offered scheduled flights to the vacation destinations of Cancún, Montego Bay, and Punta Cana for many years, through operators such as Norwegian Air Shuttle and TUI Airways.

Initially changing to the Northwest Chicagoland Regional Airport at Rockford in the early 2000s, in 2004, the airport became an official US port of entry and achieved international status. To reflect the change, it was renamed again, becoming the Chicago/Rockford International Airport (the slash was removed in 2007), bringing it in line with the two "Chicago" airports (O'Hare and Midway). In many forms of media, the airport also markets itself by its three FAA/IATA call letters: RFD.

Today the Rockford airport is marketed to residents of Rockford and surrounding areas as an alternative to Chicago Midway International Airport and O'Hare International Airport in Chicago, Mitchell International Airport in Milwaukee and Dane County Regional Airport in Madison, Wisconsin, as well as limited service airports such as Dubuque Regional Airport in Iowa. The airlines at Rockford often use their low fares as a selling point. Allegiant Air began service between Rockford and Las Vegas in November 2005 and between Rockford and St. Petersburg-Clearwater in September 2006.

Bell Bowl Prairie 

Bell Bowl Prairie is a remnant gravel hill prairie located in within the confines of Rockford Airport. It is considered a Category I Illinois Natural Areas Inventory site due to its high quality natural community of native flora and fauna. Assessed in 2018, 5 acres of the approximately 22-acre prairie were considered high quality (roughly corresponding to the INAI area), and 4.2 acres were considered "moderate quality". In 2021, most of the prairie is planned to be demolished as part of the Chicago Rockford International Airport's expansion plans.

Rockford AirFest

The Rockford airport has played host to airshows in several capacities, often becoming one of the largest events in Northern Illinois. In 1959 the Experimental Aircraft Association (EAA) moved its annual fly-in from Timmerman Field in Milwaukee to the Greater Rockford Airport after outgrowing the smaller Wisconsin airfield.  In 1960, 1000 people attended, leading to growth each year through the 1960s.  1969 would be the final year for the EAA fly-in in Rockford, as it had outgrown the Rockford airport.

For 1970, the EAA would move its annual convention/fly-in to Wittman Regional Airport in Oshkosh, Wisconsin, where it has been held ever since.

In 1986 the Greater Rockford Airport returned to hosting large-scale air shows with the Midwest AirFest.  From 1986 to 1994, the show would twice feature the United States Air Force Thunderbirds.   After an 11-year hiatus, the AirFest (rebranded as the Rockford AirFest) returned in 2005.  The airshow is one of the few in the United States that has twice hosted the combination of the United States Air Force Thunderbirds, US Navy Blue Angels, and the F-22 Raptor Demo Team.

On December 16, 2016, Airfest announced that it would be indefinitely canceled. It stated that the airport had become too busy to hold the event.

Facilities

(2,499 x 46 m) and 7/25 is 10,002 x 150 ft. (3,049 x 46 m). In 2017 the airport had 39,462 aircraft operations, average 108 per day: 61% general aviation, 31% airline, 4% military, and 3% air taxi.

Passenger
The current terminal was built in 1987 in an effort to expand airline service in Rockford, but bus service to O'Hare International Airport kept most airlines away from Rockford. Passenger service was lost completely from 2001 to 2003. An upgrade to the terminal in 2005 brought more jetways, escalators, and improved baggage handling equipment (the previous system catered to smaller turboprop aircraft rather than jets). In 2013, the terminal was renamed the Donald A. Manzullo International Terminal. In 2017, the airport received a grant to expand both passenger terminals and cargo areas.

Cargo Zone
The airport is in a foreign-trade zone. In addition to the passenger terminal, the airport is home to three cargo ramps.
Next to the main terminal ramp, the 50-acre north cargo ramp is home to the Rockford Regional Air Hub of UPS Airlines that was constructed in 1994.  The largest ramp at the airport, it has parking spaces for up to 40 jet aircraft.

Between the two runways, the smaller south ramp is home to one of two FBOs at the airport. In 2015, the former BAX Global (through Air Transport International/ATI) and DHL Express (ABX Air) cargo facilities were demolished to begin construction on a 200,000 square foot MRO facility owned and operated by AAR Corporation, which was opened in 2016.

Southwest of the UPS ramp in 2008, the airport built a third cargo ramp and a 72,000 square foot warehouse.  In 2016, the facilities were leased for the first time to ABX Air to transfer air freight to trucks through the facility.

Airlines and destinations

Passenger

Cargo

Statistics

Top destinations

For the 12-month period ending in December 31, 2021, the airport averages 129 operations per day, or about 47,000 per year. This is 51% commercial, 44% general aviation, 3% air taxi, and 2% military. There are 114 aircraft based on the field: 78 single-engine and 18 multi-engine airplanes, 15 jets, and 3 helicopters.

See also
Proposed Chicago south suburban airport

References

External links
FlyRFD.com, official website for Chicago Rockford International Airport

Rockford
Transportation buildings and structures in Winnebago County, Illinois
Transportation in Rockford, Illinois